Armandinho Boaventura Manjate (born June 30, 1970) is a Brazilian former footballer and football manager.

Football career 
Manjate began his football career in Portugal at the youth level with Sporting Clube de Portugal. He would have stints with S.C. Olhanense. In 1985, he played in the Portuguese Second Division with C.D. Cova da Piedade. In 1987, he played with S.C. Lusitânia, and later with Amora F.C. In 1989, he played in the National Soccer League with Toronto Italia, and with Toronto First Portuguese the following season.

He returned in 1994 to play in the Portuguese Terceira Divisão with G.D. Samora Correia. In 1996, he signed with Toronto Supra and served as the team captain for the 1996 CNSL season. In 1997, Manjate signed with expansion franchise Toronto Lynx in the USL A-League, and his signing was announced on April, 1997.

He also played professionally in El Salvador.

Managerial career  
Manjate serves as a technical director for EduKick Brazil Football Academy an affiliate club for Fluminense FC. He has been a youth coach for a variety of teams in the Toronto area, including the Toronto Eagles SC. He was the U15 Boys Assistant Coach for the Ontario Soccer Association, and was affiliated with Guelph Royals as an academy coach.

References 

1975 births
Living people
Sportspeople from Maputo
Brazilian footballers
C.D. Cova da Piedade players
S.C. Lusitânia players
SC Toronto players
Amora F.C. players
Toronto First Portuguese players
Toronto Italia players
Toronto Lynx players
A-League (1995–2004) players
Canadian National Soccer League players
Association football defenders
Segunda Divisão players